Costen is both a surname and a given name. Notable people with the name include:

Sam Costen (1882–1955), American football coach
Costen Jordan Harrell (1885–1971), American Methodist bishop and theologian
Costen Shockley (1942–2022), American baseball player

See also
Costen House, historic house in Pocomoke City, Maryland, United States